Upo Wetland is a complex of natural wetlands located in Changnyeong County, South Korea, near the Nakdong River. It is located in portions of Yueo-myeon, Ibang-myeon and Daehap-myeon. It derives its name from the largest of the wetlands, Upo. Other wetlands in the complex include Mokpo, Sajipo and Jjokjibeol wetlands. The complex as a whole covers 2.13 km2, and is the largest inland wetland in South Korea today. It is one of eight Ramsar wetlands in the country and one of the official visiting sites for the 10th Meeting of the Conference of the Contracting Parties that was held in Changwon, Korea in October, 2008.

Overview
Upo is home to numerous endangered, threatened and rare species. Based on a 1997 survey, the wetland is believed to be home to a total of 342 endangered or threatened species: 168 species of plants, 62 species of birds, 55 species of arthropods, 28 species of fish, 12 species of mammals, 7 species of reptiles, 5 species of amphibians, and 5 species of molluscs.

The most famous rare plant found here is the prickly lotus (Euryale ferox). A particularly noted bird species is the black-faced spoonbill. Upo provides habitat to large numbers of migrant birds, including other rare species such as the white-naped crane and taiga bean goose. A notable reptile species is the Reeves' turtle.

Most of Upo has been protected since 1997, and is now part of the Upo Ecological Park. However, agricultural and fishing activity still takes place on the wetland. A growing eco-tourism sector has developed in the country, although many local residents remain hostile to the idea of protected land. A visitor's center and observation tower have been constructed near the wetland to facilitate tourism, and an interpretive center has been established nearby.

Upo Wetland Ecological Center 
Established to facilitate the growing eco-tourism industry in South Korea, the center provides visitors with the opportunity to learn the importance of biodiversity and ecological preservation. An extensive history of the wetlands is on display as well as a number of other exhibits that pertain to the species that inhabit Upo. Constructed in 2007, approximately 150,000 people visit the center annually. Although the vast majority of the visitors are Korean, the Ecological Center provides brochures in English, Japanese and Chinese.

Wetland

Habitat
Upo provides a habitat for a number of threatened and endangered species. For example, the rare gasiyeon (lotus plant) is found only in Upo Wetland. Also currently a restoration project is underway to reintroduce the crested ibis to Upo. Last seen in 2003, the crested ibis is a symbol of the Gyengnam Province.

Flood and drought prevention
During the monsoon months of July and August, the wetlands act like a sponge to soak up the water and prevent flood damage to the surrounding agricultural areas. Throughout the year the wetlands also provide water during times of drought to the local rice and onion farmers.

Water purification
Plants such as the sweet flag and sangigarae feed on nutrients that normally cause water rot, keeping the water inside the wetland clean.

Food for the local community
Fish and plants provide the local community with a steady supply of food throughout the year. The crucian carp is a local delicacy and is very abundant throughout the wetland. During the fall harvest, locals collect water chestnuts from the floor of the wetland. In order to promote preservation, the Korean Ministry of Environment allows only thirteen local fish farmers to take fish from the wetlands. Local community members oppose the regulations, although through the center, an effort to invoke cooperation has been implemented.

Ecological and environmental education
The various plants and animals living in the wetland provide both educational and scientific opportunities. By teaching the public preservation and ecological sustainability, Upo Wetland directs the visitor's attention to developmental cooperation with the local community.

Birds 

Nonmigratory birds: Throughout the year a number of species remain in the wetland. Birds like the long-tailed tit, titmouse, flycatcher, pigeon and magpie all stay throughout the year. Also some of the migratory birds have become sedentary due to the favorable conditions of Upo.

Fish and shellfish 
Upo provides a sanctuary for a number of different fish species, both native and invasive. Also the abundance of shellfish provide food for the larger animals occupying Upo.

Plants

Plants growing at the waters edge
Pampas grass
Cattail
Sweet flag
Wild rice

Plants with leaves above the water
Water chestnut
Water lotus
Bladderwort

Underwater plants
Eelgrass

Plants floating on the water
Duckweed
Frogbit grass

Water insects and crustaceans
Diving beetle: Both the larva and adult diving beetle, also referred to as an underwater cleaner, are carnivorous. The adult diving beetle emerges from the moist earth from hibernation and pupation.
Mulijarus japonicus: The Mulijarus japonica carries eggs on its back and can easily be found in the waters around many plants like wild rice and club rush. Also called the snapping turtle, it is one of the most prominent water insects in Upo Wetland.
Water strider: The water strider is most easily found on the surface of the water moving like it is skating on the top of the water, using the thin hairs of its legs.
Gaeajaebi: The gaeajaebi lives in the lakes of the wetland feeding on small fish and insects.
Horn dragonfly: The adult horn dragonfly lives on land, while most of the larvae reside in the water of the wetland. The larvae feed on small insects such as mosquitoes.
Damselfly: The damselfly lays its eggs by inserting the egg-laying pipe into the stalks or leaves in the water plants and end up spending the majority of its youth in the water.
Water scorpion: The water scorpion is found primarily at the edge of the wetland. A reclusive hunter, it hides in the leaves waiting for its prey to pass.
Long tailed helmet shrimp: Introduced to the wetland from Central America, the long tailed helmet shrimp is not frequently found in Upo Wetland. Although in the surrounding area the long tailed helmet shrimp is commonly found in the rice paddies usually right after the seasonal flooding. White storks and egrets are usually found prowling the rice fields looking for these small shrimp.

See also
Geography of South Korea

References

External links
Upo Cyber Ecological Park, provided by the Changnyeong County government

Landforms of South Gyeongsang Province
Ramsar sites in South Korea
Parks in South Gyeongsang Province
Changnyeong County
World Heritage Tentative List